The Cyclopoida are an order of small crustaceans from the subclass Copepoda. Like many other copepods, members of Cyclopoida are small, planktonic animals living both in the sea and in freshwater habitats. They are capable of rapid movement. Their larval development is metamorphic, and the embryos are carried in paired or single sacs attached to first abdominal somite.

Distinguishing features 
Cyclopoids are distinguished from other copepods by having first antennae shorter than the length of the head and thorax, and uniramous second antennae. The main joint lies between the fourth and fifth segments of the body.

Taxonomy 
Cyclopoida contains 30 families:

 Archinotodelphyidae Lang, 1949
 Ascidicolidae Thorell, 1859
 Botryllophilidae Sars G.O., 1921
 Buproridae Thorell, 1859
 Chitonophilidae Avdeev & Sirenko, 1991
 Chordeumiidae Boxshall, 1988
 Corallovexiidae Stock, 1975
 Cucumaricolidae Bouligand & Delamare-Deboutteville, 1959
 Cyclopettidae Martínez Arbizu, 2000
 Cyclopicinidae Khodami, Vaun MacArthur, Blanco-Bercial & Martinez Arbizu, 2017
 Cyclopidae Rafinesque, 1815
 Cyclopinidae Sars G.O., 1913
 Enterognathidae Illg & Dudley, 1980
 Enteropsidae Thorell, 1859
 Fratiidae Ho, Conradi & López-González, 1998
 Giselinidae Martínez Arbizu, 2000
 Hemicyclopinidae Martínez Arbizu, 2001
 Lernaeidae Cobbold, 1879
 Mantridae Leigh-Sharpe, 1934
 Micrallectidae Huys, 2001
 Notodelphyidae Dana, 1853
 Oithonidae Dana, 1853
 Ozmanidae Ho & Thatcher, 1989
 Paralubbockiidae Boxshall & Huys, 1989
 Psammocyclopinidae Martínez Arbizu, 2001
 Pterinopsyllidae Sars G.O., 1913
 Schminkepinellidae Martínez Arbizu, 2006
 Smirnovipinidae Khodami, Vaun MacArthur, Blanco-Bercial & Martinez Arbizu, 2017
 Speleoithonidae Rocha & Iliffe, 1991
 Thaumatopsyllidae Sars G.O., 1913
 Cyclopoida incertae sedis – 8 genera 

Several more families are included in Suborder Poecilostomatoida, a temporary name for the "poecilostome lineage"  The Poecilostomatoida were previously treated as a separate order, but molecular phylogenies show that this lineage is nested within the Cyclopoida.

References

External links 

 Cyclopoida fact sheet - Guide to the marine zooplankton of south eastern Australia
 Cyclopoida pictures
 Mikko's Phylogeny Archive: Cyclopoida

 
Crustacean orders